Kristin Kobes Du Mez is an American historian. She is a professor of history and gender studies at Calvin University in Grand Rapids, Michigan.

Biography 
Du Mez grew up in Iowa, and lived in Tallahassee, Florida, during high school. She received her Bachelor of Arts degree in history and German from Dordt College, and her Doctor of Philosophy in American history from the University of Notre Dame. She worked at Williams College and at the Five College Women’s Studies Research Center at Mount Holyoke College before moving to Calvin University. She has three children.

Her first book, A New Gospel for Women: Katharine Bushnell and the Challenge of Christian Feminism, traced the life and theology of Katharine Bushnell.

Jesus and John Wayne 

Du Mez's second book, Jesus and John Wayne: How White Evangelicals Corrupted a Faith and Fractured a Nation, published in 2020, argued that American evangelicals have worked for decades to replace the Jesus of the Gospels with an idol of rugged masculinity and Christian nationalism. It received widespread coverage, including in secular media such as The Washington Post and The Boston Globe, as well as Christian outlets such as The Gospel Coalition. In July 2021, it reached number four on The New York Times Best Seller list of nonfiction paperbacks.

Selected works 

 Jesus and John Wayne: How White Evangelicals Corrupted a Faith and Fractured a Nation (2020); Liveright Publishing Corporation; 
 A New Gospel for Women: Katharine Bushnell and the Challenge of Christian Feminism (2015); Oxford University Press;

See also 

 Beth Allison Barr
 What We Believe About History

References

External links 

 Faculty page
 Personal website

American historians
Calvin University faculty
Dordt University alumni
Notre Dame College of Arts and Letters alumni
American non-fiction writers
Living people
Year of birth missing (living people)